Hubert Neuper (born 29 September 1960) is an Austrian former ski jumper. He was the winner of the first FIS Ski Jumping World Cup title in 1979/80.

Career
His best known success was at the 1980 Winter Olympics in Lake Placid, New York, where he won a silver medal in the individual large hill event. Neuper also earned a silver in the team large hill competition at the 1982 FIS Nordic World Ski Championships in Oslo. He runs a ski school in Bad Mitterndorf in Austria.

World Cup

Standings

Wins

External links 
 
 

 

1960 births
Austrian male ski jumpers
Living people
Olympic silver medalists for Austria
Olympic ski jumpers of Austria
Ski jumpers at the 1980 Winter Olympics
Olympic medalists in ski jumping
Porsche Supercup drivers
FIS Nordic World Ski Championships medalists in ski jumping
Medalists at the 1980 Winter Olympics
People from Liezen District
Sportspeople from Styria
20th-century Austrian people